The Ythan Estuary (Scottish Gaelic: Inbhir Eithein) is the tidal component of the Ythan River, emptying into the North Sea  north of Aberdeen, Scotland. Besides the tidal channel there are interfaces to the upland dunes including mudflats, sand beaches and shingle flats. Reaches of salt marsh occur, but they are primarily near the Waterside Bridge (crossing of the A975 road) and the mouth of the Tarty Burn, a small tributary river. Based upon the habitat of the moorland bordering the east of the Ythan River near the mouth, this estuary is  the most significant coastal moorland in the northern United Kingdom.

The Ythan Estuary is a designated Site of Special Scientific Interest (SSSI) and appears as site no. 939 on the Ramsar list of wetlands of international importance with Meikle Loch. There are 50 breeding pairs of common shelducks in the estuary, and there is a mixed tern breeding colony on the east shore  from the mouth comprising Arctic, Sandwich, little and common terns. Leisure activities including birdwatching, fishing, canoeing and wildfowling are permitted. There are hides to watch waders (best at low tide), and a wildfowling code of conduct with a voluntary refuge area south of the main bridge over the estuary (A975). Visitors can fish for estuarine species such as flounder for free but are advised not to disturb birds during the breeding season. Game fisher's catching salmon and sea trout is by permit only.

Topography and geometry

North of the estuary mouth extend the Sands of Forvie, the most extensive sand dune formation in Europe, which has been shown to have been a Stone Age settlement. Proceeding from the mouth the estuary inland, there are initially beach sands at the margin, thence shingle beach and mudflats. Quickly, by the time of reaching the first roadway bridge crossing about  up the estuary, there are mussel beds and marshy areas.

The verges of the upper reaches range from extensive mudflats to marsh and fen. Further upstream is a small island known as Geck Island inaccessible to waders even at low tide, and which is a haven for cormorants. The broader landscape drained by the Ythan near the coast is a generally mild sloping farmland known as the Buchan plain, which is virtually devoid of trees. In the glacial era, the Ythan River at this point would have been a torrent of melt waters streaming down from the Scottish Highlands.

Archaeology
Prehistoric man had settlements in coastal estuaries along the northeast Scottish coast including the nearby River Don Estuary and the Ythan Estuary. Studies date the lithics recovered at least as early as 7000 BC, with most of the artefacts from the Ythan mouth area deriving from the Sands of Forvie. Most of the large collection of lithics was retrieved in the period 1994-2001 from a deflation surface within this active dune system. The excavations revealed the survival of superimposed land surfaces, whose layers revealed hearth structures and other characteristic mesolithic artefacts. Although no Viking artefacts have been recovered here, a few kilometres north along the coast is the only place name associated with Viking landings, Saint Olaf at Cruden Bay.

Ecology

There are several distinct habitats within the Ythan Estuary complex including marsh, littoral, estuarine, lacustrine and dunes. Thus there is an unusual diversity of flora and fauna present in this nature reserve. The estuary itself is tidal, located seven kilometres from the North Sea. In the estuary and its verges, the presence of tern colonies is notable, since there are several distinct species that utilize the north banks of the Ythan Estuary, and comprise a percentage of the breeding pairs of terns in the United Kingdom. In the summer terns can be observed feeding in their characteristic diving patterns approximately 600 to 900 metres inland from the estuary.

At the river mouth species of birds include scaup, long-tailed duck, red-breasted merganser and velvet scoter. In lesser numbers guillemot and razorbills are occasionally seen at this outlet to the North Sea. Extensive mussel beds are found about three kilometres from the estuary mouth, and these provide food for common eider (with the occasional king eider, oystercatchers and turnstones). On the Forvie Moor element of the Ythan Estuary complex, both mute and whooper swans occur. Meikle Loch is an element of the Ythan Estuary complex and sustains some aquatic vegetation, and from November to March is home to many wading birds, ducks and geese.

Conservation status
Based upon Articles 4.1 and 4.2 of the European Union Directive 79/409/EEC this site qualifies as a Special Protection Area (SPA) by supporting biota populations of European importance. The component landforms which are considered elements of the SPA or SSSI are the estuary itself, the dunes to the east known as the Sands of Forvie, Meikle Loch and the adjacent Kippet Hills. The Ythan Estuary SPA code is UK9002221, which designation was conveyed on 30 March 1998.

Per Article 4.1, Annex I, the Ythan Estuary complex supports the following significant bird populations during the breeding season:
 Common tern Sterna hirundo, 265 pairs representing up to 2.2% of the breeding population in Great Britain.
 Little tern Sterna albifrons, 41 pairs representing up to 1.7% of the total breeding population in Great Britain
 Sandwich tern Sterna sandvicensis, 600 pairs representing up to 4.3% of the breeding population in Great Britain

The Ythan Estuary also is qualified per Article 4.2 of the EU Directive by sustaining the following winter migratory species population of European significance:
 Pink-footed goose Anser brachyrhynchus, 7213 individuals representing up to 7.7% of the mean wintering Eastern Greenland/Iceland/United Kingdom population

See also
 Fowlsheugh
 Wetland
 Important bird area

References

External links
 Fisheries Research Service Ythan Estuary Description
 Webcam overlooking the Ythan

Nature reserves in Scotland
Stone age sites
Estuaries of Scotland
Special Protection Areas in Scotland
Landforms of Aberdeenshire
Ramsar sites in Scotland
Important Bird Areas of Scotland
Bodies of water of the North Sea
Moorlands of Scotland